The 2008–09 Welsh Alliance League, known as the design2print Welsh Alliance League for sponsorship reasons, is the 25th season of the Welsh Alliance League, which is in the third level of the Welsh football pyramid.

The league consists of seventeen teams and concluded with Bethesda Athletic as champions and promoted to the Cymru Alliance.

Teams
Bethesda Athletic were champions in the previous season. Gwynedd League champions Llanllyfni and runners-up Barmouth & Dyffryn United were promoted to the Welsh Alliance League

Grounds and locations

League table

References

Welsh Alliance League seasons
2008–09 in Welsh football leagues